Chat Kuh-e Bahram Beygi (also Romanized as Chāt Kūh-e Bahrām Beygī; also known as Chāt Kū and Chāt Kūh) is a village in Pataveh Rural District, Pataveh District, Dana County, Kohgiluyeh and Boyer-Ahmad Province, Iran. At the 2006 census, its population was 78, in 15 families.

References 

Populated places in Dana County